, is the one of the longest running tournament in the history of the Japan Ladies Professional Golf Association, surpassed only by Japan Women's Open. It is one of four majors on the LPGA of Japan Tour.

Winners

See also 
Japan Golf Association
Asahi Broadcasting Corporation

External links
Official site 

LPGA of Japan Tour events
1968 establishments in Japan
Recurring sporting events established in 1968